Rav Matisyahu Chaim Salomon is a rabbi and public speaker. He serves as the mashgiach ruchani of the Beth Medrash Govoha Yeshiva in Lakewood, New Jersey, United States. He is a lecturer on topics relating to Jewish religious growth and communal issues in the yeshiva world.

Early life and education
Rav Salomon was born in Gateshead, England to R' Yaakov and Ettel. He was educated in London. During his yeshiva and kolel years, he studied for 16 years with Rabbi Chaim Kaufman, who went on to found the Gateshead Yeshiva L'Zeirim. Rabbi Salomon also studied under Rabbi Elyah Lopian, the former rosh yeshiva of Etz Chaim Yeshiva for less than a year. Nevertheless Rabbi Salomon considers Reb Elya to be his main rebbe (mentor).

Career
Rav Salomon became mashgiach ruchani of Gateshead Yeshiva, a position he held for more than 30 years. He was mashgiach in Gateshead Yeshiva initially under Rabbi Moshe Schwab and then as the senior mashgiach, before moving to Lakewood in the spring of 1998. Rabbi Salomon was succeeded at Gateshead by Rabbi Mordechai Yosef Karnowsky.

A number of books have been published  based on his public shmuesin (Mussar discourses) and shiurim (lectures) under the title Matnas Chaim on varying topics such as the Yomim Noraim (High Holidays), Moadim (holidays), Sha'arei T'shuva L'Rabeinu Yonah, Mesilas Yesharim,  Shabbos & Rosh Chodesh, and Kinyanim. The book With Hearts Full of Love is based on a series of talks by Rabbi Salomon, edited by Rabbi Yaakov Yosef Reinman. The Jewish Observer published an interview with Rabbi Salomon on the Jewish approach to marriage.

In March 2006, Rabbi Salomon was one of three rabbis from leading yeshivas in the US who participated in a forum at Congregation Bnai Yeshurun of Teaneck, New Jersey. In May 2009, Rabbi Salomon addressed the Pirchei Siyum Hamishnayos. On 15 September 2009, Rabbi Salomon was one of the speakers at a Hachnosath Sefer Torah in Lakewood, attended by over 6,000 people. In May 2012 he organized, together with Yisroel Avrohom Portugal, a mass gathering of over 40,000 people at Citi Field Stadium in order to bring attention to the dangers of using the internet.

Philosophy
Because Rabbi Matithyahu Salomon is a disciple of Rabbi Eliyahu Lopian, he follows the Kelm mussar school philosophy.

For a further discussion on the Kelm school of thought refer to the Mussar Approach of Rabbi Simcha Zissel Ziv.

References

External links
 The Lakewood View AUDIO: Rav Mattisyahu Salomon
 TorahAnytime.com video lectures

Beth Medrash Govoha
British Orthodox rabbis
Haredi rabbis in Europe
American Haredi rabbis
Living people
Mashgiach ruchani
Rabbis from New Jersey
Year of birth missing (living people)
21st-century American Jews